HMAS Commonwealth is a former Royal Australian Navy shore base located in Kure, Hiroshima in Japan. The base had been  run by the British as HMS Commonwealth, and was renamed HMAS Commonwealth on 1 October 1948. It ceased operation in June 1950, at which time the base was transferred to Japanese control. HMAS Commonwealth (Establishment) was transferred to Korea on 28 April 1952, where it continued until 19 April 1956.

See also
 List of former Royal Australian Navy bases

References

 

Commonwealth
Hiroshima
Japan in World War II
1956 disestablishments in Japan
Military units and formations disestablished in 1956